White Pony is the third studio album by American alternative metal band Deftones, released on June 20, 2000, through Maverick Records. It was produced by Terry Date, who produced the band's first two albums, Adrenaline (1995) and Around the Fur (1997). Recording sessions took place between August and December 1999 at Larrabee Sound Studios in West Hollywood and The Plant Recording Studios in Sausalito, California.

The album marked a significant growth in the band's sound, incorporating influences from post-hardcore, trip hop, shoegaze, progressive rock, and post-rock into the alternative metal sound which they had become known for. White Pony was also the first recording to feature Frank Delgado as a full-time member of the band on turntables and synthesizer; Delgado had previously worked with the band as a featured guest on their first two albums, producing sound effects on some songs. It was also the first Deftones album which Chino Moreno began to contribute rhythm guitar parts.

Upon its release and retrospectively, the album was met with critical acclaim, and is regarded by fans and critics alike as one of the band's most mature outings. White Pony is Deftones' highest-selling album to date, and it became their first platinum record certified by the RIAA on July 17, 2002. The album includes two successful singles ("Change (In the House of Flies)" and "Back to School (Mini Maggit)"), the promotional single "Digital Bath", as well as the 2001 Grammy Award-winning track for Best Metal Performance, "Elite". The album received a 20th anniversary reissue, packaged with Black Stallion, a companion remix album of White Pony, in December 2020.

Background and recording
After a break from touring, the band spent four months in the studio writing and recording White Pony with producer Terry Date, the longest amount of time they had dedicated to an album thus far. Frontman Chino Moreno explained that the majority of this time was spent trying to write songs, and that the writing of "Change (In the House of Flies)" was the turning point where the band began working as a unit.

Despite being pressured to release the album sooner, the band decided to take their time making the album. Bassist Chi Cheng explained, "We didn't feel like we had anything to lose, so we made the record we wanted to make." Moreno did not have an overall lyrical theme in mind, but made a conscious decision to bring an element of fantasy into his lyrics, explaining, "I basically didn’t sing about myself on this record. I made up a lot of story lines and some dialogue, even. I took myself completely out of it and wrote about other things. Once I did that I was able to sing about anything I wanted to, I could be a lot more general. There’s a lot of stuff on this record that people are going to question me about, and I can just remove myself from it. It’s not me. I’m writing a story here."

Although the band initially did not intend to include guest musicians on the album, it features additional vocals by Maynard James Keenan (Tool, A Perfect Circle) on "Passenger" and Rodleen Getsic (simply credited as Rodleen) on "Knife Prty". "Rx Queen"  also features vocal contributions from Stone Temple Pilots frontman Scott Weiland, though he is uncredited. Weiland brought Moreno to his studio for collaboration, where he would sing along and suggest vocal harmonies; the result was left in the final version of the song, and credit for Weiland's part was never discussed by either party.

Composition

Stylistically, White Pony combines the band's standard alternative metal sound, influenced by bands such as Tool, Faith No More and Nine Inch Nails, with the layered atmospherics of The Cure, specifically their Pornography era. It has also been categorized as an art rock and nu metal album, though several critics also acknowledge that the record moved beyond the latter label. Metal Hammer likened the album to a metal version of Radiohead's critically acclaimed OK Computer (1997). The original opener for the album, "Feiticeira," lacks conventional song structure and builds over a background of guitars and bass. Moreno discussed the lyrics to the song: "The name Feiticeira is some Portuguese name that I read in a magazine and just liked. It's based on the scenario of being taken captive. It's completely fictional. I want that people who listen to it feel like they are the ones in the situation. Because of that I sing it in first person. It's up to people to figure out if i'm having fun (with them) or not, even though it sounds a bit eerie". "Digital Bath" features a trip hop drum beat with Moreno's vocals over heavy two-guitar trade-offs and a more atmospheric texture from Delgado.

"Elite" is more straightforward and heavy and lacks typical Deftones dynamics, containing industrial rock influences. Moreno said that the song "is laughing at everybody trying to become what they already are. If you want to be one of the elite, you are". "Rx Queen"' contains heavy percussive effects and stuttering bass. Moreno considers it "the most futuristic song in the album". On "Street Carp", after a brief guitar introduction, the band crashes in with full force. Moreno said: "It's a classic Deftones song, with a rolling riff and some really interesting chords in the chorus. the vocals are kinda crazy - I'm singing out loud over the top of the music, like (The Smiths front man) Morrissey or something, a cool contrast". Although the song was not released as a single, a promo video was made for it. "Teenager" consists of an acoustic riff and a "scratching" line with a trip-hop beat and glitch influences. The song deals with a youthful romance coming to an end. Moreno stated that he wrote the lyrics when he was 15 after a first date and that it was originally a Team Sleep song.

The opening chords for "Knife Prty" lead into a distorted introduction with a moving bass line and a vocal bridge sung by Getsic in Spanish-Arabic style. Chino said, "It's a seductive song with a lot of violent imagery. People don't tend to like sex mixed with violence. The mid section has amazing vocals from a girl called Rodleen who worked next door to our studio". In a review of the album, iTunes notes that: "Jeff Buckley would have been thrilled at how 'Knife Party' expands the hard-rock notions of his Grace — the track’s bridge finds singer Chino Moreno pulling off a worthy tribute to Buckley’s falsetto." An atmospheric, heavy song with a bleak guitar line and a bridge featuring a subtle scratch solo by Delgado, "Korea" is considered one of the album's highlights. "Passenger" features a guitar intro and vocal interplay between Keenan and Moreno alongside piano and keyboard lines, leading to heavy guitar that introduces the choruses.

"Change (In the House of Flies)" was the album's lead single, and became a radio hit. Moreno compared it to earlier single "Be Quiet and Drive (Far Away)", considering it "a beautiful metamorphosis". The closer, "Pink Maggit" is a bleak and moody song with a whispered melody from Moreno, concluding with a final explosion. Moreno described the song: "The title comes from a Kool Keith song ("No Chorus" from First Come, First Served). We just thought it was some funny stuff. The song is meant to be triumphant. I'm trying to spread a little confidence. Lots of artists try to make songs for the kids who are tormented in school, telling them it's okay to be tormented. But it's not okay. Don't be ridiculed. Become the leader of your surroundings. Confidence is one of the most important things in life. If you are confident, you can do whatever you want".
“Pink Maggit” is known for being the album’s and the band’s longest song to date (excluding “MX” on Around the Fur, which is 37 minutes due to over 20 minutes of silence), clocking in at 7:32.

Leading off the reissued version of the album, "Back to School (Mini Maggit)" is a reinterpretation of the album's closer with additional rap or hip hop influences. Moreno later declared that he regretted the creation of the song and its placement on the album. "The Boy's Republic" is a song exclusive to the limited-edition releases of the album, with lyrics about someone desperately seeking redemption, and comes after "Pink Maggit," making it the final track on the limited edition.

Album title
"White pony" is street slang for cocaine. However, there are other meanings for the album name, including a sexual reference, as explained by Moreno:

"There's a lot of different references for White Pony. One of them is a cocaine reference and there's a lot of stuff... have you ever heard stuff like in dream books that if you dream about a white pony, then you're having a sexual dream? There's a lot of stuff that kinda goes around it. And there's an old song [that goes], 'Ride the white horse.' That's obviously a drug-reference song." white pony also refers to high grade pure heroin. Heroin is sometimes referred to as “horse”,the uncut white heroin is “white pony”

Release
Five different editions of the album exist. On its release date, limited-edition numbered copies were released with solid red and black jewel cases. The two differently colored cases also featured different booklet inserts. Both limited-edition versions included "The Boy's Republic" but not "Back to School (Mini Maggit)."

The edition with a gray cover was released as the initial non-limited version of the album and did not include "The Boy's Republic". This, along with the red and black versions, were the properly sequenced version of the album as the band intended. The gray version was later superseded by the current white version, which added "Back to School (Mini Maggit)" as the first track. This was only added as a marketing strategy, a decision that Moreno stated that he was unhappy with. The original release was also pressed on clear red vinyl for a promotional run of about 1,000 copies.

In honor of the album's 20th anniversary, Deftones re-released White Pony on December 11, 2020 packaged with Black Stallion, a bonus remix album. Black Stallion features the full track list of the original White Pony album in order with each song recreated by a different producer with an "electronic, beat-driven" approach. Deftones originally conceived of doing a remix album prior to the recording of White Pony and had reached out to DJ Shadow to remix the entire album himself. Black Stallion includes remixes from DJ Shadow, Clams Casino, Robert Smith, Mike Shinoda and more; and was promoted with a music video for Purity Ring's remix of "Knife Prty".

Reception

White Pony was well received by critics, garnering an aggregate rating of 72 on Metacritic. Several reviewers praised Moreno's increasing lyrical sophistication and the group's sonic experimentation.

Billboard gave the album 4 out of 5 stars, though it cautioned that "the band's continuous inclination toward a bludgeoning experimental sonic attack and Moreno's violent, impressionistic lyrics made the album a tough pill to swallow for most listeners". Similarly, BBC Music praised the album while opining: "[The fact] that such a progressive, risk-taking LP wasn't celebrated across the board for its gutsy reinventing of a band thought pigeonholed wasn't that surprising, though – this is a difficult album." In a favorable review, Alternative Press noted the album’s "art-rock explorations." Publications such as Rolling Stone and Q were somewhat less enthusiastic. The former lamented that the album was overproduced to sound too much like their influencers, while the latter wondered if White Pony was "their most adventurous and assured album to date?".

In 2016, Jonathan Dick of NPR Music retrospectively praised the album as a watershed moment or turning point, not only in regards to the Deftones' sound but also, more generally, to heavy and experimental music in the new millennium, describing the album as signaling "not only a change for the band but a new trajectory for heavy and experimental music entering the 21st century". Dick especially noted the album's "shift into the heavy post-rock, shoegaze spectrum" and contended that, within the span of five years from the band's debut album to the release of White Pony, Deftones had distinguished itself as a band "whose sound no longer fit too comfortably under any genre-specific title". Similarly, Mike Diver of Clash magazine asserted that White Pony "changed everything – not just for Deftones, but metal as a whole", noting the album's "distinct air of progressive rock" and its ability to weave electronics into aggressive yet reflective songs. Pitchfork retrospectively noted that White Pony "transcended the dubious genre [of nu-metal] by fashioning a truly new form from post-hardcore, industrial, trip-hop, shoegaze, ambient electronics, and synth-pop."

Accolades
Alternative Press ranked White Pony as the second best album of 2000, and in their September 2010 issue, placed it in their list of the "Top 10 Most Influential Albums of 2000". UK rock magazine Kerrang! named White Pony their third best album of the year behind Queens of the Stone Age's Rated R and At the Drive-In's Relationship of Command. In 2011, Complex Media Network's music website, Consequence of Sound, honored White Pony on a "List 'Em Carefully" installment dedicated to writer David Buchanan's top 13 metal records released between 2000 and 2010, noting that Deftones was one of several acts who "helped usher the popularity of complex structure meets MTV audience". In 2017, Rolling Stone ranked White Pony as 66th on their list of 'The 100 Greatest Metal Albums of All Time.' In 2019, The Guardian ranked it 29th on their list of 'The 100 best albums of the 21st century'. In 2020, it was named one of the 20 best metal albums of 2000 by Metal Hammer magazine.

The album's third track, "Elite", won the Grammy Award for Best Metal Performance in 2001. Deftones drummer Abe Cunningham commented on the awards night: "All the people were on the ground, on the floor, and we were up sort of in the balcony, we were like, 'We're not gonna win. Look where we're sitting.' Everybody else who was winning, they'd get up there quick and get back. So we were just watching it and the whole thing was rad, just seeing the (stuff) go down. And all of a sudden they called our name. We just jumped over this balcony down onto the floor and ran up there. It was pretty cool, man".

The album won the 2000 Kerrang! Award for Album of the Year. 

At the 2001 California Music Awards, it won Outstanding Hard Rock/Heavy Metal Album.

Track listing

 Note: "Knife Prty" (track 7, or 8 on the reissue) is spelled "Knife Party" on most of the European versions of the album and contains backing vocals by Rodleen Getsic.

Personnel 
Personnel adapted from album liner notes, unless otherwise noted.

Deftones
 Chino Moreno – vocals, rhythm guitar
 Stephen Carpenter – lead guitar
 Chi Cheng – bass, backing vocals
 Frank Delgado – keyboards, turntables
 Abe Cunningham – drums

Additional musicians
 Rodleen Getsic – additional vocals (on "Knife Prty") 
 Maynard James Keenan – lead vocals (on "Passenger")
 Scott Weiland – additional vocals (on "Rx Queen"; uncredited)

Other personnel
 Frank Maddocks – art direction, album design
 James Minchin III – photography

Technical personnel
 Kim Biggs – creative director
 CrookOne – drum programming
 Robert Daniels – assistant engineer
 Terry Date – production, mixing
 Michelle Forbes – assistant engineer
 Scott Olson – Pro Tools engineer, additional engineering
 Ted Regier – assistant engineer
 Jason Schweitzer – assistant engineer
 Howie Weinberg – mastering
 Ulrich Wild – additional engineering

Charts

Weekly charts

Year-end charts

Singles

Certifications

References

External links
 In-depth article on White Pony

Deftones albums
2000 albums
Maverick Records albums
Albums produced by Terry Date
Nu metal albums by American artists